Illinois Route 390 (IL 390), previously known as the Elgin–O'Hare Expressway, now known as the Elgin–O'Hare Tollway, is a  electronic toll highway in northeastern Illinois. IL 390 currently connects U.S. Route 20 (US 20, Lake Street) in Hanover Park to the intersection with Illinois Route 83 (IL 83) and Thorndale Avenue in Wood Dale. The only other towns it borders are Schaumburg and Roselle. Construction is underway to extend the road from IL 83 to the western edge of O'Hare International Airport.

Route description 
IL 390 begins at an interchange with US 20 in Hanover Park and branches off northeastward as a six lane toll road, traveling over a half-mile-long (0.8 km) bridge over the Metra Milwaukee District West Line tracks, and some wetlands. The highway then enters Cook County from DuPage County and intersects IL 19 (Irving Park Road). At Meacham Road, the highway crosses back south into DuPage County. IL 390 continues east for  through Wood Dale, Elk Grove Village (again), and Bensenville, and finally ends at an intersection with IL 83 in Bensenville just short of the west side of O'Hare International Airport. IL 390 was the first route in the state to have all-electronic toll collection, predating the 2021 conversion to all-electronic tolling on all Illinois State Toll Highway Authority roads; cash is not accepted, and an I-Pass/E-ZPass is required.

History 

Although the concept of an Elgin–O'Hare Expressway dates back to the 1960s, the highway was not seriously considered until the late 1980s. Around that time, congestion was rapidly increasing on local roads, especially US 20 (Lake Street). Although Lake Street was extensively widened prior to the completion of the highway, initially to Glen Ellyn Road and then to the Roselle-Bloomingdale border nearly ten years later, its capacity was still insufficient for the rapidly growing western suburbs. Construction on the highway began around 1991 and was completed two years later. Governor Jim Edgar opened the highway at an afternoon ceremony on November 2, 1993.

When the highway first opened, both of its termini had traffic signals with major arterial roads in the area. This arrangement caused large backups during weekday rush hours. According to the Illinois Department of Transportation (IDOT), average daily traffic counts (in 2003) for IL 390 are 39,600 vehicles for the western  and around 82,000 to 87,000 cars per day for the remainder.

On October 29, 2013, IDOT announced that the highway was re-designated IL 390 at groundbreaking ceremonies for the Elgin–O’Hare Western Access Project. Shortly after, maintenance of the road was transferred to the Illinois State Toll Highway Authority (ISTHA), and toll collection on the existing segment from US 20 in Hanover Park to I-290 in Itasca began in 2016. ISTHA began constructing an eastward extension of IL 390 to a new interchange on the western border of O'Hare International Airport with the planned I-490 connecting I-90 to the north and I-294 to the south. This interchange may also incorporate ramps into a planned western terminal at O'Hare. The official groundbreaking for the expansion took place on October 29, 2013. The first  segment of this extension, opened at a ribbon-cutting ceremony on November 1, 2017, stretching from the upgraded interchange with I-290 in Itasca to IL 83 in Bensenville. East of I-290, IL 390 was formerly a four-lane arterial at-grade road known as Thorndale Avenue until its upgrade into an extension of IL 390, along with the interchange with I-290. Thorndale Avenue ran from I-290 to York Road near the western border of O'Hare International Airport. After its upgrade, the Thorndale Avenue designation was assigned to the new frontage roads along both sides of the eastern extension of IL 390.

Future 
The remaining section of IL 390 from IL 83 in Bensenville to the western edge of O'Hare International Airport is currently under construction and is expected to open by 2024. , a feasibility study is underway on the western extension of IL 390 from US 20 to North Avenue in Bartlett, as well as improvements to US 20 between North Avenue in Bartlett and Shales Parkway in Elgin. However, unlike the original plans, the entire extension is proposed to be an arterial road rather than a limited–access freeway or tollway.

Exit list 

The remaining portion of Thorndale Avenue will continue as a frontage road of IL-390.

References

External links 

Illinois Highway Ends: Elgin-O'Hare Expressway
Airport Planning & O'Hare Airport (DuPage County)
O'Hare International Airport Master Plan 

390
Expressways in the Chicago area
O'Hare International Airport
Toll roads in Illinois
Interstate 90
Transportation in DuPage County, Illinois
Transportation in Cook County, Illinois